House at 115 Central Avenue is a historic home located at Sea Cliff in Nassau County, New York.  It is a -story building with a full raised basement and a -story central tower with polygonal roof in the Queen Anne style. It has a decorative slate hipped roof with gable and jerkin head dormers and features a variety of exterior decorative details.

It was listed on the National Register of Historic Places in 1988.

References

Houses on the National Register of Historic Places in New York (state)
Queen Anne architecture in New York (state)
Houses completed in 1890
Houses in Nassau County, New York
National Register of Historic Places in Nassau County, New York